Admiral Senyavin was a  of the Soviet Navy.

Development and design 

The Sverdlov-class cruisers, Soviet designation Project 68bis, were the last conventional gun cruisers built for the Soviet Navy. They were built in the 1950s and were based on Soviet, German, and Italian designs and concepts developed prior to the Second World War. They were modified to improve their sea keeping capabilities, allowing them to run at high speed in the rough waters of the North Atlantic. The basic hull was more modern and had better armor protection than the vast majority of the post Second World War gun cruiser designs built and deployed by peer nations. They also carried an extensive suite of modern radar equipment and anti-aircraft artillery. The Soviets originally planned to build 40 ships in the class, which would be supported by the s and aircraft carriers.

The Sverdlov class displaced 13,600 tons standard and 16,640 tons at full load. They were  long overall and  long at the waterline. They had a beam of  and draught of  and typically had a complement of 1,250. The hull was a completely welded new design and the ships had a double bottom for over 75% of their length. The ship also had twenty-three watertight bulkheads. The Sverdlovs had six boilers providing steam to two shaft geared steam turbines generating . This gave the ships a maximum speed of . The cruisers had a range of  at .

Sverdlov-class cruisers main armament included twelve /57 cal B-38 guns mounted in four triple Mk5-bis turrets. They also had twelve /56 cal Model 1934 guns in six twin SM-5-1 mounts. For anti-aircraft weaponry, the cruisers had thirty-two  anti-aircraft guns in sixteen twin mounts and were also equipped with ten  torpedo tubes in two mountings of five each.

The Sverdlovs had   belt armor and had a   armored deck. The turrets were shielded by  armor and the conning tower, by  armor.

The cruisers' ultimate radar suite included one 'Big Net' or 'Top Trough' air search radar, one 'High Sieve' or 'Low Sieve' air search radar, one 'Knife Rest' air search radar and one 'Slim Net' air search radar. For navigational radar they had one 'Don-2' or 'Neptune' model. For fire control purposes the ships were equipped with two 'Sun Visor' radars, two 'Top Bow' 152 mm gun radars and eight 'Egg Cup' gun radars. For electronic countermeasures the ships were equipped with two 'Watch Dog' ECM systems.

Construction and career
The ship was built at Baltic Shipyard in Leningrad and was launched on 22 December 1952 and commissioned on 30 November 1954. On 18 December 1954, she entered the 4th Navy.

On 7 September 1955, she was transferred to the Northern Fleet. Then on 24 December 1955, after crossing the Northern Sea Route from Severomorsk to the Far East, she was transferred to Pacific Fleet.

From 17–21 November 1959, she visited Surabaya.

From 31 December 1966 to 24 July 1972, she underwent modernization and rebuilt at Dalzavod in Vladivostok according to Project 68U2 Bukhta-2.

From 14–19 January 1973, she visited to Bombay. From 15–20 March, she visited to Mogadishu. On 13 March, she was reclassified as a command cruiser. From 20–24 December, she visited to Port Louis.

From 1975 to 1977, the cruiser was commanded by Feliks Gromov, the future admiral of the fleet.

On 13 June 1978, during the a live-firing test, an explosion followed by fire occurred on the ship in the first bow turret of the main battery, killing 37 of the ship's crew.

From 5–10 November 1979, she visit to Haiphong.

On 1 December 1986, she was decommissioned from the navy, mothballed and laid to rest.

On 30 May 1989, she was disarmed and expelled by the navy. On 15 December, she was struck from the navy list.

In 1992, she was sold to a private Indian firm for scrap in India.

Pennant numbers

See also 
Cruiser

List of ships of the Soviet Navy
List of ships of Russia by project number

References

Ships built at the Baltic Shipyard
Sverdlov-class cruisers
Maritime incidents in 1978
Cold War cruisers of the Soviet Union
1952 ships